Stanhope is an English surname of medieval origins, meaning 'a dweller on a stony ridge'. It has also been used as a given name.

List
Notable people with the name include:

Surname
 Alexander Stanhope (1638–1707), English envoy in Madrid
 Arthur Stanhope (1627–1694), English politician who sat in the House of Commons
 Arthur Stanhope, 6th Earl Stanhope (1838–1905), British Conservative Party politician
 Charles Stanhope (disambiguation), multiple people
 Doug Stanhope (born 1967), American stand-up comedian
 Edward Stanhope (1840–1893), British Conservative Party politician
 Elizabeth Stanhope (disambiguation), multiple people
 Ferdinando Stanhope (died 1643), English politician who sat in the House of Commons
 George Stanhope (1660–1728), clergyman of the Church of England
 George Stanhope (disambiguation), multiple people
 Henry Stanhope (disambiguation), multiple people
 Lady Hester Stanhope (1776–1839), British socialite, adventurer and traveler
 James Stanhope (disambiguation), multiple people
 John Stanhope (disambiguation), multiple people
 Jon Stanhope (born 1951), Australian politician
 Leicester Stanhope, 5th Earl of Harrington (1784–1862), English peer and soldier
 Louisa Stanhope ( 1806–1827), English novelist 
 Katherine Stanhope, Countess of Chesterfield (1609–1667), English governess and Postmaster General
 Mark Stanhope (born 1952), British Royal Navy officer
 Michael Stanhope (disambiguation), multiple people
 Philip Stanhope (disambiguation), multiple people
 Richard Stanhope (born 1957), British Olympic rower
 Rosamund Stanhope (1919–2005), British poet and teacher
 Sydney Stanhope, 6th Earl of Harrington (1845–1866), English peer
 Thomas Stanhope (1540–1596), English Member of Parliament for Nottinghamshire
 William Stanhope (disambiguation), multiple people
 Stanhope (Middlesex cricketer), cricketer from 1787 to 1798

Given name
 Stanhope Aspinwall (1713–1771), British diplomat
 Stanhope Forbes (1857–1947), Irish-British artist and founder of a school of painters
 Stanhope Wood Nixon (1894–1958), vice president of Nixon Nitration Works during the company's 1924 disaster

See also
 Earl Stanhope, hereditary title held by seven people since 1718
 Baron Stanhope, hereditary title created in 1605
 Spencer-Stanhope family, family of British landed gentry
 Scudamore-Stanhope, surname

References